Manila is an unincorporated community in Johnson County, Kentucky, United States. Manila's original post office opened on July 1, 1898 and was named in honor of the Battle of Manila Bay, which had occurred earlier that year. The community's ZIP code is 41238.

Manila is at an elevation of 794 feet.

References

Unincorporated communities in Johnson County, Kentucky
Unincorporated communities in Kentucky